The Arthur Hewes House, at 811 St. Joe in Spearfish, South Dakota, was built in 1905.  It was listed on the National Register of Historic Places in 1990.

It is a two-and-a-half-story wood-frame house on a stone foundation.  It was deemed notable as "a good example of the Queen Anne style of architecture as popular in Spearfish, South Dakota, during the late 19th and early 20th centuries."

Arthur Hewes operated a general store in Spearfish from 1903 to 1921 or later.

References

Houses on the National Register of Historic Places in South Dakota
Queen Anne architecture in South Dakota
Houses completed in 1905
Lawrence County, South Dakota
1905 establishments in South Dakota